Sixto Soria Savigne (born April 27, 1954 in Santiago de Cuba) is a Cuban boxer, who won the silver medal in the men's Light Heavyweight (81 kg) category at the 1976 Summer Olympics in Montreal. As the top favourite he lost in a close fight to Leon Spinks of USA. Two years later he captured the world title at the second World Championships in Belgrade. He lost in the quarter-finals of the 1979 Pan American Games to American Tony Tucker.

1976 Olympic results 
Round of 32: bye
Round of 16: Defeated José Rosa (Puerto Rico) second-round knockout
Quarterfinal: Defeated Wolfgang Gruber (West Germany) second-round knockout
Semifinal: Defeated Costică Dafinoiu (Romania) referee stopped contest in first round
Final: Lost to Leon Spinks (USA) referee stopped contest in third round (was awarded silver medal)

References

1954 births
Living people
Sportspeople from Santiago de Cuba
Light-heavyweight boxers
Boxers at the 1976 Summer Olympics
Olympic boxers of Cuba
Olympic silver medalists for Cuba
Olympic medalists in boxing
Boxers at the 1979 Pan American Games
Pan American Games competitors for Cuba
Cuban male boxers
AIBA World Boxing Championships medalists
Medalists at the 1976 Summer Olympics
20th-century Cuban people
21st-century Cuban people